Iivari Yrjölä (10 September 1899 – 11 November 1985) was a Finnish athlete. He competed in the men's decathlon at the 1924 Summer Olympics.

References

External links
 

1899 births
1985 deaths
Athletes (track and field) at the 1924 Summer Olympics
Finnish decathletes
Olympic athletes of Finland
People from Hämeenkyrö
Olympic decathletes
Sportspeople from Pirkanmaa